Ronde Van Vlaanderen Beloften is a Flanders Classics road bicycle race. It is the version of the Tour of Flanders for under-23 riders and is usually contested a week after the Ronde van Vlaanderen. Ludovic Capelle is the only rider who has been able to win this race twice.
Since 2008 the race has been included on the Cup of Nations calendar, and it is restricted to national teams.

Winners

References

External links
 

Classic cycle races
UCI Europe Tour races
Cycle races in Belgium
Recurring sporting events established in 1936
1936 establishments in Belgium